is a Japanese Nippon Professional Baseball pitcher for the Hokkaido Nippon-Ham Fighters in Japan's Pacific League. He previously played for the Yokohama BayStars.

Notes and references

External links

Living people
1981 births
Baseball people from Yokohama
Japanese baseball players
Nippon Professional Baseball pitchers
Chunichi Dragons players
Yokohama BayStars players
Hokkaido Nippon-Ham Fighters players
Deaf baseball players
Japanese deaf people